The 2022–23 Armenian Cup is the 32nd edition of the football competition in Armenia. The competition began on 4 October 2022.

Teams

First round
On 20 September 2022 the draw for the First Round of the Armenian Cup took place, drawing 4 clubs from the Armenian First League with the 8 lowest ranked clubs from the previous season of the Armenian Premier League together.

Quarterfinals
On 19 October, the draw for the Quarterfinal of the cup took place.

Semi–finals
On 30 November, the draw for the Semi–final of the cup took place.

Scorers

3 goals:

 Wilfried Eza - Ararat-Armenia

2 goals:

 Luka Juričić - Pyunik
 Moussa Bakayoko - Shirak
 Allasane Doumbia - Shirak
 Artyom Gevorkyan - Shirak

1 goals:

 Thiago Galvão - Alashkert
 Bladimir Díaz - Alashkert
 Sergei Ivanov - Alashkert
 Kevin Reyes - Alashkert
 Agdon Menezes - Ararat-Armenia
 Alen Karapetyan - Gandzasar Kapan
 David Paremuzyan - Gandzasar Kapan
 Olaoluwa Ojetunde - Lernayin Artsakh
 Noriki Akada - Mika
 Dramane Salou - Noah
 Yusuf Otubanjo - Pyunik
 Lyova Mryan - Shirak
 Alen Stepanyan - Syunik
 Narek Grigoryan - Urartu
 David Khurtsidze - Urartu
 Maksim Mayrovich - Urartu
 Dmytro Khlyobas - Urartu
 Mubarak Ahmed - Van
 Sani Buhari - Van
 Bohdan Mytsyk - Van

Own goals:

See also
 2022–23 Armenian Premier League
 2022–23 Armenian First League

References

External links
 FFA

Armenian Cup seasons
Armenian Cup
Cup